Tütünlü is a village in the Şemdinli District in Hakkâri Province in Turkey. The village is populated by Kurds of the Humaru tribe and had a population of 2,126 in 2022. Tütünlü has the Güleç hamlet attached to it.

It is a tobacco-producing village.

Population 
Population history of the village from 2000 to 2022:

References 

Villages in Şemdinli District
Kurdish settlements in Hakkâri Province